Berget is a surname. Notable people with the name include:

Given name
Berget Lewis, Dutch singer part of the Dutch formation Ladies of Soul

Middle name
Ragna Berget Jørgensen (born 1941), Norwegian politician 
Aksel Berget Skjølsvik (born 1987), Norwegian footballer

Surname
David Berget (born 1988), Norwegian film director and screenwriter
Jo Inge Berget (born 1990). Norwegian footballer
Stian Berget (born 1977), Norwegian footballer